This page lists individuals and organisations who publicly expressed an opinion regarding the 2014 Scottish independence referendum.

Not all of the individuals listed were able to vote in the referendum, even some of those with a Scottish background.

Against independence

Political parties
Registered political parties
Britannica
Conservative Party
Scottish Conservatives
Labour Party
Liberal Democrats

Non-participant political parties
Alliance for Workers' Liberty
Britain First
British National Party
Communist Party of Britain
Respect Party
Socialist Equality Party
UK Independence Party
Workers' Revolutionary Party

Campaigning groups and individuals
The following organisations and individuals registered with the Electoral Commission as supporting a No vote.
Alistair McConnachie – individual
Angus MacDonald – individual
Better Together, official campaign
Better with Scotland
Cumbria Broadband Rural and Community Projects Ltd.
Ghill Donald – individual
Grand Orange Lodge of Scotland
Let's Stay Together
No Borders Campaign
Stirlingshire for No Thanks
The Scottish Research Society
Tony George Stevenson – individual
WFS2014 Ltd

Publications
Newspapers

Magazines
The Economist  (UK-wide)
The Spectator (UK-wide)

Businesses
BAE Systems, defence contractor.
BP, oil and gas company.
William Grant & Sons, distillers.

Trade unions
Associated Society of Locomotive Engineers and Firemen (ASLEF).
Communication Workers Union.
Community.
GMB – trade union
Union of Shop, Distributive and Allied Workers (USDAW).

Other organisations
Academics Together.
Business Together.
Forces Together.
Lawyers Together.
LGBT Together.
NHS Together.
Rural Together.
Women Together.
Work Together.

Individuals

Politicians
Contested elections with Scotland

Within the rest of the United Kingdom

International

Business people

Actors

Musicians

Sportspeople

Writers and academics

Other public figures

For independence

Political parties
Registered political parties
Scottish Greens
Scottish National Party
Scottish Socialist Party
Solidarity

Non-participant political parties
English Democrats
Green Party of England and Wales
Revolutionary Communist Party of Britain (Marxist-Leninist)
Socialist Party of England and Wales

Campaigning groups and individuals
The following groups and individuals registered with the Electoral Commission as supporting a Yes vote.
1001 Campaign
Business for Scotland, a business-oriented campaign.
Christians for Independence
Farming 4 Yes
Generation Yes
Labour for Independence, members of the Scottish Labour Party who support independence.
National Collective
Radical Independence Campaign
Sarah-Louise Bailey-Kelly – individual
Scottish Campaign for Nuclear Disarmament
Scottish Independence Convention
Spirit of Independence
Wealthy Nation
Wings Over Scotland, a political website.
Women for Independence
Yes Scotland, official campaign.

Publications
Newspapers
Sunday Herald
Scots Independent

Trade unions
Edinburgh, Lothians, Fife, Falkirk and Stirling branch of the Communications Workers Union (CWU).
Prison Officers Association, Scotland area.
National Union of Rail, Maritime and Transport Workers (RMT), Scotland area.

Other organisations
Academics for Yes.
Lawyers for Yes
Scottish Secular Society

Individuals

Politicians
Contested elections with Scotland

Within the rest of the United Kingdom

International

Artur Mas, President of the Generalitat of Catalonia.
Milorad Dodik, President of Republika Srpska.

Bernard Drainville, Member of the National Assembly of Quebec

Business people

Actors

Musicians

Sportspeople

Writers and academics

Other public figures

Officially endorse neither side
After the Confederation of British Industry (CBI) attempted to register with the Electoral Commission as a group supporting a "no" vote in the referendum, several organisations resigned or suspended their membership of the CBI in order to maintain their neutrality. The CBI had its registration annulled, with its director saying that the attempt to register had given the misleading impression that it was a political entity.

Political parties
Socialist Party of Great Britain

Publications
Newspapers
Daily Record (Scotland)
Sunday Mail (Scotland)
The Independent on Sunday (UK-wide)
The Observer (UK-wide)
The Scottish Sun (Scotland)

Trade unions
Public and Commercial Services Union (PCS)
Unite
Voice

Businesses

Other organisations

Individuals

Other opinions
A compilation of "doubters" by Better Together and journalist Simon Johnson was published by the Daily Telegraph on 24 March 2014.  It listed individuals and organisations who have raised concerns about Scottish independence, although they have not necessarily expressed outright opposition. During the financial reporting season in early 2014, several companies (including Aggreko, Lloyds Banking Group, Barclays, Standard Life, Royal Bank of Scotland, Macfarlane Group and Breedon Aggregates) listed Scottish independence as an issue in their risk management sections.

Businessmen, including Sir Tom Hunter and Sir Tom Farmer, called for more clarity in the referendum debate to best make a decision.

In 2012, the Scottish Trades Union Congress (STUC) published a report called A Just Scotland, which laid out "challenges for both sides of the debate", in particular calling on Better Together to "outline a practical vision of how social and economic justice can be achieved within the union". The STUC had previously refused an offer to join the Better Together campaign.

References

Endorsements
Scottish independence referendum